Camault Muir is a scattered crofting community and part of the village of Kiltarlity, in the Highland council area of Scotland. It is situated on a boggy plateau about 0.6 miles (1 km) south of the main part of Kiltarlity, and 10 miles (16 km west) of Inverness. Its name derives from the Scottish Gaelic "cam-allt", meaning "crooked burn"—a reference to the small, winding stream running through it.

Around the Camault Muir circuit is Highland Liliums Garden Centre, a small, family-run business began in 1974. Liliums has its own shop, but also supplies native and alpine plants to other centres around Scotland.

References

Populated places in Inverness committee area